The 1993 Southwest Conference women's basketball tournament was held March 10–13, 1993, at Moody Coliseum in Dallas, Texas. 

Number 1 seed  defeated 2 seed  78-71 to win their 2nd championship and receive the conference's automatic bid to the 1993 NCAA tournament.

Format and seeding 
The tournament consisted of an 8 team single-elimination tournament.

Tournament

References 

Southwest Conference women's Basketball Tournament
1993 in American women's basketball
1993 in sports in Texas
Basketball in Dallas